"Youth of the Nation" is a song by American Christian metal band P.O.D. It was released on November 27, 2001, as the second single to come from their second major label album, Satellite. It was inspired in part by the school shootings at Santana High School and Columbine High School. "Youth of the Nation" was the band's only No. 1 hit on the Modern Rock chart and reached No. 28 on the Billboard Hot 100, their only single to reach the top 40, and No. 6 on the Mainstream Rock chart. The song was included in "Weird Al" Yankovic's polka medley "Angry White Boy Polka" from his 2003 album Poodle Hat, despite lead singer Sonny Sandoval's mixed-race background.

Background
The song's inspiration stems from a trip when the band was on their way to record for Satellite on March 5, 2001. They were held up in traffic and discovered that the reason was a mass shooting at Santana High School, where a fifteen-year-old student named Charles Andrew Williams killed two and wounded thirteen. The album was consequently delayed, and the band was inspired to write "Youth of the Nation."

In a 2008 interview, guitarist Marcos Curiel described the event:
"We were rehearsing and writing Satellite a couple of blocks away from the school. One day on the way to the studio, there were all these helicopters and cars speeding by. We really didn’t know what was going on. When we got to the studio, this guy had the news on, and he was like, ‘This kid just went and started blasting fools.’ So we started jamming, and that rhythm just naturally came out, then Wuv [Bernardo, drummer] put that drumbeat on it, and the song was born."

Curiel added, "When you can hear something that's going to uplift you like 'Alive' or something that's going to bring out knowledge like 'Youth of the Nation,' we've done our jobs as an artist."

Lyrics and song structure
"Youth of the Nation" contains three stories of adolescent tragedy in American culture. It begins by describing a teenager skating to school only to be shot by a fellow student. Lyrics go on to speculate whether or not the boy who committed the act felt unloved. Following the chorus, a 12-year-old girl called "little Suzie" is depicted as having been abandoned by her father and subsequently "finding love in all the wrong places." Finally, another teen known as "Johnny boy" fails to fit in with his peers and ultimately commits suicide by firearm, "[telling] the world how he felt with the sound of a gat [handgun]."

Music video
The music video for "Youth of the Nation" has the band performing the song in a room filled with photos of adolescents as seen on the single cover. It revolves around a group of teenagers taking a cross country trip in a car from New York City to Venice Beach in Los Angeles via Western Pennsylvania (New Kensington, Arnold, Cheswick, Harmarville), Carhenge is used as a backdrop for parts of the chorus along with other locales. The book On the Road by Jack Kerouac can be seen on the dashboard of the car. Directed by Paul Fedor, the video found significant airplay on MTV2.

The video features a prefamous Joel David Moore as the teenager driving the car.

Marcos Curiel noted that censorship of the video came into play due to Viacom: "We had a girl sitting on the hood of the car going down the highway trying to be free-spirited, you know? [...] But, Viacom and MTV had us edit that out because kids are so easily influenced."

Awards
2003 Grammy Awards
 Best Hard Rock Performance (nomination)

2002 MTV Video Music Awards
 Best Rock Video (nomination)

Track listings
US promo CD
 "Youth of the Nation" (radio edit) – 4:05
 "Youth of the Nation" (album version) – 4:16

'''UK, European, and Australian CD single
 "Youth of the Nation" (album version) – 4:17
 "Alive" (semi-acoustic version) – 3:23
 "Sabbath" – 4:32

Chart and sales

Weekly charts

Year-end charts

Certifications

Release history

References

2001 singles
2001 songs
American alternative rock songs
Atlantic Records singles
P.O.D. songs
Rap rock songs
Songs about bullying
Songs about school
Songs about suicide
Teenage tragedy songs
Song recordings produced by Howard Benson
Songs written by Noah Bernardo
Songs written by Marcos Curiel
Songs written by Traa Daniels
Songs written by Sonny Sandoval
Impact of the Columbine High School massacre